Henry Robert Westenra, 3rd Baron Rossmore (24 August 1792 – 1 December 1860), was an Anglo-Irish Member of Parliament and peer, from 1843 to 1852 Lord Lieutenant of Monaghan.

Life
The eldest son of Warner Westenra, 2nd Baron Rossmore (1765–1842) by his first marriage to Mary Ann Walsh, Henry Robert Westenra was born on 24 August 1792 at his mother's family seat, Walsh Park in County Tipperary. He was educated at Westminster School and Trinity College, Dublin, where he matriculated on 4 July 1810. His portrait was painted the same year by John Ferneley (1782–1860), showing him with his dogs and carrying a shotgun.

Westenra was Member of Parliament for County Monaghan from 1818 to 1830, again from 1831 to 1832 and from May to July 1834, and finally from 1835 to 1842. On 10 August 1842, on the death of his father, he succeeded as The 3rd Baron Rossmore, of Monaghan in the County of Monaghan, in the Peerage of Ireland, and as The 2nd Baron Rossmore, of the County of Monaghan, in the Peerage of the United Kingdom, the second title giving him a seat in the House of Lords. From 1843 to 1852 he was Lord Lieutenant of County Monaghan.

A member of a family of individualists, Rossmore was a prolific letter-writer, and his surviving letters have been described as "voluminous, frequently vitriolic, and very instructive".

He was also an accomplished player of the Irish pipes, and was considered to be the equal of a good professional piper. In Twenty Years Recollections of an Irish Police Magistrate (1880), Frank Thorpe Porter  recalled an evening when Rossmore 

On 25 January 1820 he married in Edinburgh Anne Douglas-Hamilton (born c. 1796 – died 1844). She was the daughter of Douglas Hamilton, 8th Duke of Hamilton (1756–1799), and Harriet Pye Bennett. In right of this wife Rossmore inherited an estate on the Scottish Isle of Arran.

On 19 May 1846, after the death of his first wife, Rossmore married secondly at Camla Vale, County Monaghan, his cousin Josephine Julia Helen (née Lloyd), with whom he had six children:
 Frances Kathleen (d. 7 August 1925) married Major Henry Augustus Candy on 3 August 1870. Had a son and daughter.
 Norah Josephine Harcourt (d. 13 September 1934) married Maj. Gilbert Stirling on 3 December 1873. No known issue.
 Henry Cairns Westenra, 4th Baron Rossmore (1851–1874)
 Derrick Warner William Westenra, 5th Baron Rossmore (1853–1921)
 Lt. Richard Hamilton (1854–1880) 
 Peter Craven (1855–1932). married Innys Maud Eaglesfield Daubeny, daughter of Lansdowne Daubeny, on 30 April 1895. They had two daughters.

According to Rossmore's second son, the fifth baron, "My father's favourite amusements were yachting, shooting and fishing, and, oddly enough, playing the bagpipes, at which he excelled." He also reported that Rossmore had suffered from a very bad stammer.

Death
Lord Rossmore died on 1 December 1860 at his country house in County Monaghan, Rossmore Park, and was buried there on 7 December 1860. The house was abandoned in the 1940s, fell into ruin, and was demolished in 1975.

His granddaughter Kathleen (1872–1955), married The 7th Duke of Newcastle in 1899 and was a dog breeder who influenced the Borzoi and Wire Fox Terrier breeds.

References

External links
 

1792 births
1860 deaths
Alumni of Trinity College Dublin
Barons in the Peerage of Ireland
Barons in the Peerage of the United Kingdom
Eldest sons of British hereditary barons
Lord-Lieutenants of Monaghan
Westenra, Henry
People educated at Westminster School, London
People from County Monaghan
Westenra, Henry
Westenra, Henry
Westenra, Henry
Westenra, Henry
Westenra, Henry
Westenra, Henry
Westenra, Henry
Westenra, Henry
Rossmore, B3